The S. P. Jain Institute of Management and Research (SPJIMR) is a private non-profit post-graduate management school based in Mumbai, India. Founded in 1981 under the aegis of Bharatiya Vidya Bhavan, The institute offers several full-time and part-time management programmes.

History 

In 1981, SPJIMR was inaugurated by the British prime minister, Margaret Thatcher, as the Bharatiya Vidya Bhavan's  Institute for Master of Management Studies. The first batch joined the institute for the Master of Management Studies, or MMS programme. The class of 1983 was placed in several top companies, including BPCL, HDFC Ltd., Johnson & Johnson, Wipro, Asian Paints, Nerolac Paints Ltd, and Godrej & Boyce. In 1986, Dr. M.L. Shrikant joined the institute as the dean and led the institution for almost three decades, introducing new methods of teaching and imparting management education

In 1992, SPJIMR acquired an autonomous status. The MMS programme was then renamed as PGDM.

In 1994 and 1995, Development of Corporate Citizenship (DoCC)  and ADMAP (Assessment and Development of Managerial and Administrative Potential)  were launched respectively. PGDM students work with non-profit organisations in rural India for six weeks as part of DoCC. Students from PGDM work in committees as part of ADMAP. This helps develop skills to enhance their managerial potential.

In 2000, autumn internships were started for the PGDM students after they completed their specialisation phase. This ensured that they were more industry ready.

In June 2015, Dr. M.L. Shrikant was succeeded by Dr. Ranjan Banerjee as the dean of the institute. In 2016, SPJIMR's new rebranded logo was unveiled. The five upward strokes represent the five personality attributes of the new SPJIMR brand – authentic, dynamic, grounded, innovative, and socially sensitive.

In 2016 SPJIMR collaborated with Harvard Business School (HBS) Publishing to be the national training partner for teaching using business simulations. SPJIMR also set up a Design Thinking lab, to make learning more relevant and practical.

The Post Graduate Management Programme for Women (PGMPW) was launched in 2016. The programme is a full-time management programme for women who have taken a career break and seek to return to their professional careers. SPJIMR also launched the Fellow Programme in Management (FPM) in 2016 to prepare the next generation of academic researchers and thought leaders.

In 2018, SPJIMR received the accreditation from the Association to Advance Collegiate Schools of Business (AACSB), International. The Delhi centre was also inaugurated in the same year with long-term and short-term programmes. These focused on Executive Education and was designed to meet the needs of middle to senior-level executives.

In 2019, a new building opened with state-of-the-art classrooms, group work rooms, a Design Thinking Lab, a new library and an MDP room. It also has a new auditorium named after Dr. M. L. Shrikant.

March 2020 saw the world grapple with COVID-19 bringing life to a halt. SPJIMR pushed back and brought  all the programmes online within 24 hours of the lockdown. Academics, inaugurations, farewells, meetings went online seamlessly.

In September 2021 Dr. Varun Nagaraj took over as the dean of the institute  following Dr. Ranjan Banerjee who led the institute until early 2021.

Campus 

SPJIMR is situated on a 45-acre campus, in the metropolis of Mumbai.

The campus is equipped with hostels, Wi-Fi, cafeterias and recreation spots like a large lake.

The Delhi Centre of SPJIMR is spread over 13,000 square feet, in the Bharatiya Vidya Bhavan Campus, on Kasturba Gandhi Marg.

Academics 
SPJIMR offers several post graduate full-time programmes, such as: 
2-year, Post Graduate Diploma in Management (PGDM)    
 15-month, Post Graduate Programme in Management (PGPM) 
 11-month, Post Graduate Management Programme for Women (PGMPW) 
 6-months at the Global Management programme (GMP), India and completion of the programme at partner schools in Europe/USA. 
 Full-time doctoral programme, Fellow Programme in Management (FPM) 

Modular programmes, such as:

 18-month modular programme for family businesses, the Post Graduate Family Managed Business (PGFMB) programme.
 21-month modular programme for working executives, the Post Graduate Executive Management Programme (PGEMP).
 2-year executive programme at the Delhi centre, the Post Graduate Programme in General Management (PGP-GM).
 18-month executive management programme for professionals working in the social development sector, Post Graduate Programme in Development Management (PGPDM) 

Short-term programmes offered:

 Start Your Business (SYB) 
 Grow Your Business (GYB) 
 Management Development Programmes (MDPs) 
 Doing Business in India (DBI)

Rankings 

Internationally, SPJIMR was ranked in the 151–200 band in the QS "Global MBA Rankings 2023" and 27 in Asia. It was ranked 44 in the world in Financial Times "Masters in Management 2022" ranking.

In India, SPJIMR was ranked 21 in the National Institutional Ranking Framework (NIRF) management ranking of 2022. It was ranked fifth by Business Today "India's Top Five B-Schools Yearly Ranking In 2022".

Accreditation 
SPJIMR has been awarded accreditation by AACSB International (Association to Advance Collegiate Schools of Business).

SPJIMR's PGDM programme has been granted “A” grade accreditation of India by National Board of Accreditation (NBA)  and the Association of Indian Universities (AIU) recognises the two-year course as equivalent to an MBA degree from an Indian university.

The PGDM, PGPM, PGEMP, PGPGM, PGPFMB and PGPDM programmes are accredited by the Association of MBAs (AMBA), UK.

The PGDM, PGPM and FPM programmes are approved by All India Council for Technical Education (AICTE).

Notable alumni 

SPJIMR alumni include:

Business
 Madan Padaki, co-founder and director of Sylvant Advisors
 Girish Wagh, head, commercial vehicle business unit Tata Motors
 Pradeep Kar, founder, chairman and managing director of Microland
Anant Bajaj, MD, Bajaj Electricals
Rajesh Jejurikar, Executive Director (Auto & Farm Sectors), Mahindra Group
Deepak Iyer, President at Mondelez International, India 
Debjani Ghosh, President, Nasscom
Hardeep Singh, CEO, 7-Eleven, India 
Deepak Shetty, Chief Executive Officer and Managing Director - JCB India 
Mansi Madan Tripathy, Vice President, Asia Pacific at Shell
Lulu Raghavan, Managing Director at Landor & Fitch, India 
Shalini Kapoor, IBM Fellow & CTO for AI, Climate & Sustainability - AI Applications, IBM
Ritu Arora, CEO & Chief Investment Officer Asia, Allianz Investment Management 
Ramki Sankaranarayanan, Founder, President & CEO of Prime Focus Technologies 
Anaheeta Goenka, President at Mullen Lowe Lintas Group
Kaustubh Uday Dhavse, Public Policy Advisor, Government of Maharashtra, India

Arts
 Siddharth Suryanarayan, Indian film actor, screenplay writer, producer and Playback singer
Vikarm Sampath, Indian Historian and Fellow of Royal Historical Society.

Sports
 Dipankar Bhattacharjee, Olympian and National Badmintion Champion, and founder of Dipankar's Badminton Academy, Guwahati

References

Jain universities and colleges
Business schools in Mumbai
All India Council for Technical Education
Universities and colleges affiliated with the Bharatiya Vidya Bhavan
Educational institutions established in 1981
1981 establishments in Maharashtra